This is a list of paintings by Dutch painter Johan Jongkind. Jongkind's most frequent subject was the marine landscape.

1840s and 1850s

1860s

1870s

1880s

Unknown date

References 

Lists of paintings